Emme may refer to:

People:
 Ivan Fyodorovich Emme (1763–1839), Russian lieutenant general in the Napoleonic Wars
 Otto J. Emme, American politician and World War I veteran
 Emme Gerhard (1872–1946), American photographer
 Emme Rylan, American actress born Marcy Faith Behrens in 1980
 Emme (model), plus-size model born Melissa Miller in 1963
Edna L. Emme, American hair care expert

Other uses:
 Emme (river), Canton of Berne, Switzerland

See also
 Kleine Emme, a river in the Canton of Lucerne, Switzerland
 Emmen (disambiguation)